Nikola Malović (born July 8, 1970) is a Serbian prose and drama writer. He is a member of the Serbian Literary Society.

Based in Herceg Novi,  Boka Kotorska - Bay of Kotor, Montenegro.

His books have been translated into English, Russian, Polish  and Bulgarian.

Works
 Poslednja decenija (The last decade) (1998)
 Kapetan Vizin – 360 stepeni oko Boke (Capt. Vizin) (2002)
 Peraški goblen (Perast needlepoint) (2003)
 Lutajući Bokelj (Wandering man from the Bay of Kotor) (2007)
 Prugastoplave storije (Blue-stripped stories) (2010)
 Jedro nade (2014)
 Galeb koji se smeje : Roman za decu i odrasle (2019)

References 

Serbian novelists
Serbian writers
1970 births
Living people
People from Kotor
People from Herceg Novi
Serbs of Montenegro